Quarantotto is an Italian surname. Notable people with the surname include:

Antonio Quarantotto (1897–1987), Italian swimmer
Lucio Quarantotto (1957–2012), Italian songwriter

Italian-language surnames